The 1946 Davidson Wildcats football team was an American football team that represented Davidson University as a member of the Southern Conference during the 1947 college football season. In its first season under head coach William Story, the team compiled a 4–5 record (1–5 against conference opponents) and outscored opponents by a total of 206 to 130. The team played its home games at Richardson Stadium in Davidson, North Carolina.

Schedule

References

Davidson
Davidson Wildcats football seasons
Davidson Wildcats football